Andrew Ponstein (born May 2, 1976) is an American professional stock car racing driver. He is a former competitor in the NASCAR Nationwide Series, NASCAR Camping World Truck Series, and ARCA Re/Max Series.

Racing career

A graduate of Hope College, Ponstein began his professional racing career in 1998, competing in the American Speed Association; moving to the CRA Super Series in 2001, he won his first race in the series in 2003.

Ponstein got his feet wet in NASCAR beginning in 2003, when he ran two races in the No. 70 Ford for the J&J Motorsports team, owned by John Bailey. He started in his first 15th at IRP and finished that race in 24th. His next race came at  Richmond, where he finished 22nd despite a blown engine. He also competed in five ARCA Re/Max Series races that year.

Ponstein started 2004 off with a deal to drive the No. 39 Yahoo Ford for Jay Robinson Racing. After sitting out Daytona, Ponstein started 30th and would finish 25th in his debut at Rockingham. His debut would turn out to be his best run of the year, as he could only manage two other top-30s at Darlington (29th) and Nazareth (27th). Ponstein asked for his release from the team after nine races into 2004. He spent several years out of NASCAR, before returning in 2008 to drive for Corrie Stott Racing, competing for the next four years in selected Nationwide Series races, as well as five Camping World Truck Series races in 2009. In 2010, he raced in the first NASCAR Nationwide Series race at Road America.

In 2011, Ponstein returned to the CRA Super Series, as well as running Super Late Models at Berlin Raceway.

Motorsports career results

NASCAR
(key) (Bold – Pole position awarded by qualifying time. Italics – Pole position earned by points standings or practice time. * – Most laps led.)

Nationwide Series

Camping World Truck Series

ARCA Re/Max Series
(key) (Bold – Pole position awarded by qualifying time. Italics – Pole position earned by points standings or practice time. * – Most laps led.)

References

External links
 

Living people
1976 births
People from Jenison, Michigan
Racing drivers from Michigan
NASCAR drivers
ARCA Menards Series drivers
American Speed Association drivers
Hope College alumni